Punk Statik Paranoia is the third album by the industrial metal band Orgy. It was released on February 24, 2004, their first independent recording.

The album's style is a big departure from the electronic rock sound that was present in Candyass and Vapor Transmission, leaning more to an aggressive nu metal sound similar to bands like Korn and Linkin Park. It is also the first Orgy album to feature occasional screaming vocals.

Sales and chart performance
Punk Statik Paranoia debuted at #11 on the Billboard Independent Albums chart. The album sold 5,353 copies during its first week of release.

Track listing

References

Orgy (band) albums
2004 albums